Gevorg Harutyunyan (born in 1990) is an Armenian artist, singer-songwriter and dancer. He represented Armenia in the 2018 New Wave Contest in Sochi, Russia. In 2014, Harutyunyan won the fourth season of Parahandes (the Armenian version of the British television series Strictly Come Dancing).

Filmography

References

Living people
Musicians from Yerevan
Armenian pop singers
21st-century Armenian male singers
The X Factor contestants
Armenian Apostolic Christians
Armenian singer-songwriters
Year of birth missing (living people)